Lichtenberg is a commune in the Bas-Rhin department in Grand Est in north-eastern France.

The village forms a part of the Parc naturel régional des Vosges du Nord.

Geography
Surrounding communes are Baerenthal in the neighbouring Moselle département to the north-east, Offwiller et Rothbach to the south-east, Ingwiller in the south, Wimmenau in the south-west and Reipertswiller to the north-west.

Landmarks
 Château de Lichtenberg (Lichtenberg Castle)
 The Catholic Church contains Stations of the Cross by Marie-Louis Sorg (Wikipedia France).

See also
 Communes of the Bas-Rhin department

References

Communes of Bas-Rhin
Bas-Rhin communes articles needing translation from French Wikipedia